Benjamin Auer (born 11 January  1981) is a German former professional footballer who is a centre-forward.

Internationally, he represented Germany playing for the U21 and B teams.

Career
Born in Landau, Auer played as a child for hometown club ASV Landau, before moving to his first bigger youth team, FSV Offenbach. At the age of 15 he moved to 1. FC Kaiserslautern, for whom he played until 1999. He moved to Karlsruher SC where he played for a year, before going to Borussia Mönchengladbach.

Auer played 23 times for the German under-21 team, scoring 15 goals, and played around 60 times in his youth between the ages of 16 and 20. He helped bring Mainz 05 up to the Bundesliga in 2004.

He joined 2. Bundesliga side Alemannia Aachen on 1 July 2008 and stayed there until Aachen's relegation to the 3. Liga in summer 2012.

After a career break from 2012 to January 2015, Auer signed for Regionalliga Südwest-side FK Pirmasens on 29 December 2014 before retiring in 2015.

External links

References

Living people
1981 births
Association football forwards
German footballers
Alemannia Aachen players
VfL Bochum players
1. FSV Mainz 05 players
Borussia Mönchengladbach players
1. FC Kaiserslautern players
Karlsruher SC players
FK Pirmasens players
Bundesliga players
2. Bundesliga players
Regionalliga players
Germany youth international footballers
Germany under-21 international footballers
Germany B international footballers
People from Landau
Footballers from Rhineland-Palatinate